Beat & Soul is an album by The Everly Brothers, originally released in 1965. It peaked at No. 141 on the Billboard Pop Albums charts. It was re-released on CD in 2005 on the Collectors' Choice Music label.

Reception

Writing for Allmusic, music critic Richie Unterberger wrote of the album "While the performances are pretty good—and the vocals perennially better than good—it also seemed to be an indication that the pair were unwilling or unable to write or procure a decent supply of new material. Because of the overfamiliarity of most of the songs, it has to rate as one of the brothers' less interesting efforts, regardless of the high level of execution."

Track listing
Side one
 "Love Is Strange" (Mickey Baker, Sylvia Robinson, Ellas McDaniel) – 2:53
 "Money" (Janie Bradford, Berry Gordy) – 2:32
 "What Am I Living For?" (Art Harris, Fred Jay) – 3:05
 "Hi-Heel Sneakers" (Robert Higginbotham) – 3:16
 "C.C. Rider" (Gertrude "Ma" Rainey) – 2:12
 "Lonely Avenue" (Doc Pomus) – 2:34
Side two
"Man With Money" (Don Everly, Phil Everly) – 2:20
 "People Get Ready" (Curtis Mayfield) – 2:05
 "My Babe" (Willie Dixon) – 2:40
 "Walking the Dog" (Rufus Thomas) – 2:39
 "I Almost Lost My Mind" (Ivory Joe Hunter) – 2:37
 "The Girl Can't Help It" (Bobby Troup) – 2:09

Personnel
Don Everly – vocals, guitar
Phil Everly – vocals guitar
James Burton – guitar
Glen Campbell – guitar
Sonny Curtis – guitar
Larry Knechtel – bass
Jim Gordon – drums
Leon Russell – piano
Billy Preston – piano

References

External links
Liner notes for Collector's Choice reissue by Richie Unterberger.

1965 albums
The Everly Brothers albums
Warner Records albums
Albums produced by Dick Glasser